Pointe-aux-Trembles was a municipality, founded in 1674, that was annexed by Montreal, Quebec, Canada, in 1982. This was the last city to be merged into Montreal until the 2002 municipal reorganization.
On January 1, 2002 this neighbourhood at the far east end of the Island of Montreal became part of the borough of Rivière-des-Prairies–Pointe-aux-Trembles–Montréal-Est. On January 1, 2006 Montreal East demerged, and the borough became Rivière-des-Prairies–Pointe-aux-Trembles.

One can find a windmill, at the corner of Notre-Dame Street and Third Avenue, which was built in 1719. Its three storeys make it the tallest windmill in Québec that still stands. In 1650 the Grou family of Rouen France established a land holding here.

Education
The Commission scolaire de la Pointe-de-l'Île (CSPI) operates Francophone schools in this area. The district's headquarters is in Pointe-aux-Trembles. The École secondaire Pointe-aux-Trembles and the École secondaire Daniel-Johnson are both within the community.

Primary schools:

 Félix-Leclerc
 François-La Bernarde
 Le Tournesol
 Montmartre
 Notre Dame
 Saint-Marcel
 Sainte-Germaine-Cousin
 Sainte-Marguerite-Bourgeoys
 Sainte-Maria-Goretti

The English Montreal School Board (EMSB) operates Anglophone schools serving the area.

The community is served by the Pointe-aux-Trembles branch of the Montreal Public Libraries Network.

See also
 Jean Basset (died 1715)
 Boroughs of Montreal
 Districts of Montreal
 Municipal reorganization in Quebec
 History of Montreal
 Pointe-aux-Trembles (electoral district)
 Pointe-aux-Trembles railway station

References

Neighbourhoods in Montreal
Populated places established in 1674
Rivière-des-Prairies–Pointe-aux-Trembles
1674 establishments in New France